Stoudamire is a surname. Notable people with the surname include:

 Damon Stoudamire (born 1973), American basketball player and coach
 Salim Stoudamire (born 1982), American basketball player, cousin of Damon

See also
 Stoudamire, an album by Kevin Seconds
 Stoudemire, a surname